Nick Carter is a fictional character who began as a dime novel private detective in 1886 and has appeared in a variety of formats over more than a century. The character was first conceived by Ormond G. Smith and created by John R. Coryell. Carter headlined his own magazine for years, and was then part of a long-running series of novels from 1964 to 1990. Films were created based on Carter in France, Czechoslovakia and Hollywood. Nick Carter has also appeared in many comic books and in radio programs.

Literary history

Nick Carter first appeared in the story paper New York Weekly (Vol. 41 No. 46, September 18, 1886) in a 13-week serial, "The Old Detective's Pupil; or, The Mysterious Crime of Madison Square"; the character was conceived by Ormond G. Smith, the son of one of the founders of Street & Smith, and realized by John R. Coryell.  Coryell retired from writing Nick Carter novels and the series was taken over by Frederick Van Rensselaer Dey, who wrote 1,076 novels and stories from 1890 until his suicide in 1922. The character proved popular enough to headline its own magazine, Nick Carter Weekly.  The serialized stories in Nick Carter Weekly were also reprinted as stand-alone titles under the New Magnet Library imprint. By 1915, Nick Carter Weekly had ceased publication and Street & Smith had replaced it with Detective Story Magazine, which focused on a more varied cast of characters.  There was a brief attempt at reviving Carter in 1924–27 in Detective Story Magazine, but it was not successful.

In the 1930s, due to the success of The Shadow and Doc Savage, Street & Smith revived Nick Carter in a pulp magazine (called Nick Carter Detective Magazine) that ran from 1933 to 1936.  Since the Doc Savage character had basically been given Nick's background, Nick Carter was now recast as more of a hard-boiled detective.  Novels featuring Carter continued to appear through the 1950s, by which time there was also a popular radio show, Nick Carter, Master Detective, which aired on the Mutual Broadcasting System network from 1943 to 1955.

Killmaster revival

Following the success of the James Bond series in the 1960s, the character was updated for a long-running series of novels featuring the adventures of secret agent Nick Carter, aka the Killmaster. The first book, Run Spy Run, appeared in 1964 and more than 260 Nick Carter-Killmaster adventures were published up until 1990.

Two additional books have been erroneously listed as Killmaster novels by some sources: Meteor Eject!, a memoir by an RAF pilot named Nick Carter, published in 2000, and a 2005 release entitled Brotherhood, which is actually an autobiography of singer Nick Carter of the Backstreet Boys.

The 100th Killmaster novel—Nick Carter 100—was accompanied by an essay on the 1890s version, and a short story featuring the character; that marked one of the few times the Killmaster series acknowledged its historical roots.

None of the Nick Carter series of books carried author credits, although it is known that several of the earliest volumes were written by Michael Avallone, and that Valerie Moolman and NYT bestselling author Gayle Lynds wrote others, making this the first series of its kind to be written in significant part by women. Bill Crider is another author identified with Nick Carter.

The Nick Carter name was treated as if it were a pseudonym, and many of the volumes were written in the first person.

Authors
The works were published under the house pseudonyms "Nicholas Carter" and "Sergeant Ryan".
Authors known to have contributed include the following:
 John R. Coryell (1848–1924)
 Frederick W. Davis (1858–1933), who wrote eight Nick Carter stories for The New Nick Carter Weekly in 1910 and 1912, as well as writing extensively under the pen name "Scott Campbell"
 Frederick Van Rensselaer Dey (1861–1922), who took his own life
 Thomas C. Harbaugh (1849–1924), who died penniless in the Miami County Home in Ohio
 George C. Jenks (1850-1929)
 Eugene T. Sawyer (1847–1924)
 Charles Westerbrook
 Richard Edward Wormser (1908–1977), who claimed to have written 17 Carter magazine stories published in 1932–33

Stories are also credited to Harrison Keith, the joint pseudonym of John A. L. Chambliss and Philip Clark, who both wrote for the franchise.

Books

New Magnet Library

Films
The character has had a long and varied film history, with three countries producing films based on it.

France

Éclair
In 1908, the French film company Éclair engaged Victorin-Hippolyte Jasset to make a serial film based on the Nick Carter novels which were then being published in France by the German publisher Eichler.  Nick Carter, le roi des détectives, with Pierre Bressol in the title role, was released in six episodes in late 1908, and enjoyed considerable success. Further adaptations followed with Nouvelles aventures de Nick Carter in 1909, and the character was revived for a confrontation with a master criminal in Zigomar contre Nick Carter in 1912.

1960s
American actor Eddie Constantine played the title roles in the French-made spy films Nick Carter va tout casser (1964) and Nick Carter et le trèfle rouge (1965). In one curiously circular and self-referential scene, Constantine (as Carter) enters a house where he finds a large collection of Nick Carter pulp magazines and other Nick Carter memorabilia. Both films are unconnected to the Killmaster book series.

Germany
The Hotel in Chicago (1920), The Passenger in the Straitjacket (1922), Women Who Commit Adultery (1922), and Only One Night (1922) are among the silent films made in Germany featuring Nick Carter.

United States

MGM
Walter Pidgeon portrays  Nick Carter in a trilogy of films released by Metro-Goldwyn-Mayer: Nick Carter, Master Detective (1939), Phantom Raiders (1940 and Sky Murder (1940). Though MGM owned the rights to a large number of Nick Carter stories, the films used original screenplays.

In the 1944 MGM movie The Thin Man Goes Home, detective Nick Charles (William Powell) is seen reading a Nick Carter Detective magazine while relaxing in a hammock.

Columbia
Columbia could not afford the rights to produce a Nick Carter serial, so they made one about his son instead;  Chick Carter, Detective appeared in 1946.

Television
In 1972,  Robert Conrad made a television pilot,  The Adventures of Nick Carter, which was set in the Victorian era, It was shown as a rare made-for-TV installment of the ABC Sunday Night Movie, which normally featured theatrical releases edited for broadcast.

Czechoslovakia
The Czechoslovakian movie Dinner for Adele (1977) is a parody inspired by Nick Carter's pulp magazine adventures. It features "America's most famous detective" visiting Prague at the beginning of the 20th century and solving a case involving a dangerous carnivorous plant (the Adele of the title). The Slovak actor Michal Dočolomanský played Nick Carter.

Radio

Nick Carter first came to radio as The Return of Nick Carter. Then Nick Carter, Master Detective, with Lon Clark in the title role, began April 11, 1943, on Mutual, continuing in many different timeslots for well over a decade. Jock MacGregor was the producer-director of scripts by Alfred Bester, Milton J. Kramer, David Kogan and others. Background music was supplied by organists Hank Sylvern, Lew White and George Wright.

Patsy Bowen, Nick's assistant, was portrayed by Helen Choate until mid-1946 and then Charlotte Manson stepped into the role. Nick and Patsy's friend was reporter Scubby Wilson (John Kane). Nick's contact at the police department was Sgt. Mathison (Ed Latimer). The supporting cast included Raymond Edward Johnson, Bill Johnstone and Bryna Raeburn. Michael Fitzmaurice was the program's announcer. The series ended on September 25, 1955.

Chick Carter, Boy Detective was a serial adventure that aired weekday afternoons on Mutual. Chick Carter, the adopted son of Nick Carter, was played by Bill Lipton (1943–44) and Leon Janney (1944–45). The series aired from July 5, 1943 to July 6, 1945.

Comic books
In 1937, the Brazilian comic artist Renato Silva published a comic strip strip starring Nick Carter published in the comic book Suplemento Juvenil.

Nick Carter and Chick Carter appeared in comics published by Street & Smith from 1940 to 1949.

Nick appeared in The Shadow Comics, then moved to Army & Navy Comics and Doc Savage Comics briefly, before moving back to The Shadow Comics.  Some of these appearances were in text stories.

Chick appeared in The Shadow Comics, some of which were in text stories.

There was also Nick Carter, a 1972 Italian comic strip featuring detective Nick Carter.

See also
 List of Street & Smith publications

References

Sources
 Tuska, Jon. The Detective in Hollywood, 1978. .

External links
Thrilling Detective
Nick Carter pulp magazines
Nick Carter Fantastic Fiction – Bibliography
Full-text issues of New Nick Carter Weekly at Northern Illinois University
Nick Carter New Magnet Library Collection at the George Peabody Library

Listen "A Broken Bond" by Nick Carter on Youtube

Audio
Nick Carter, Master Detective radio shows (16 episodes)
Nick Carter, Master Detective radio shows (125 episodes)

 
Fictional private investigators
Characters in pulp fiction
Street & Smith
Characters in American novels of the 20th century
Literary characters introduced in 1886
Film serial characters
Characters in dime novels
Literature franchises